Gnanambika is a 1940 Indian Malayalam film,  directed by S. Nottani and produced by Annamala Chettiyar. The film stars K. K. Aroor, Alleppey Vincent and Sebastian Kunjukunju Bhagavathar in lead roles. The film had musical score by T. K. Jayarama Iyer.

Cast
 K. K. Aroor
 Alleppey Vincent
 Sebastian Kunjukunju Bhagavathar
 Mavelikkara Ponnamma
 Nanukkuttan
 C. K. Rajam
 M. P. Sanku
 Seethalakshmi
 Mathappan

References

External links
 

1940 films
1940s Malayalam-language films
Indian black-and-white films